The Girl with the Dragon Tattoo is a 2005 crime novel by Stieg Larsson.

The Girl with the Dragon Tattoo may also refer to:

 The Girl with the Dragon Tattoo (2009 film), a Swedish-language film
 The Girl with the Dragon Tattoo (2011 film), an English-language film
 The Girl with the Dragon Tattoo (soundtrack)
 Lisbeth Salander, the fictional character to whom the title refers

See also
Millennium (novel series), novel series featuring Lisbeth Salander by Larsson
Millennium (miniseries), 2010 Swedish television adaptation
Dragon Tattoo Stories (film series), American film series adaptation